Distribution company (DISCO) is a company under Pakistan Electric Power Company (PEPCO) and is responsible for distribution of electricity in their respective allocated areas. They buy electricity from Water and Power Development Authority (WAPDA), PEPCO and other private Independent Power Producers (IPPs) and sell it to their respective area customers. All companies are owned by the Government of Pakistan except K-Electric, which was privatized in 2005. Unfortunately, most of the electricity distribution companies in Pakistan are highly ineffecient and leads to huge line losses of electricity.

List
The following are the distribution companies (DISCOs) operating in Pakistan:
Faisalabad Electric Supply Company (FESCO)
Gujranwala Electric Power Company (GEPCO)
Hazara Electric Power Company (HEPCO)
Hyderabad Electric Supply Company (HESCO)
Islamabad Electric Supply Company (IESCO)
Karachi Electric Supply Company (KESC) (Now privately owned as K-Electric)
Lahore Electric Supply Company (LESCO) 
Multan Electric Power Company (MEPCO) 
Peshawar Electric Power Company (PESCO) 
Quetta Electric Supply Company (QESCO)
Sukkur Electric Power Company (SEPCO)
Tribal Electric Supply Company (TESCO)

See also

Electricity sector in Pakistan
Alternative Energy Development Board
National Electric Power Regulatory Authority (NEPRA)

References

Pakistan distribution
Electric supply company
Pakistan